Raja Dina Nath Madan (Razdan) (1795–1857) aka Diwan Dina Nath or Dina Nath, who was a Kashmiri Hindu, rose to the position of the Privy Seal and finance minister (Diwan) in the Punjab empire of Maharaja Ranjit Singh.

Life
Dina Nath was civil administrator and counsellor of considerable influence at the Sikh court for well over three decades, was the son of a Kashmiri Pandit, Bakht Mal, who had migrated to Delhi in 1815, during the oppressive rule of the Afghan governors of the valley and obtained a berth in the Estate Office at Lahore. He was also closely related to Diwan Ganga Ram Raina, head of the military accounts and keeper of the privy seal at Lahore.

In 1815, at the instance of Diwan Ganga Ram Raina, Maharaja Ranjit Singh invited Dina Nath to Lahore and offered him the post of mutsaddi, or writer, in the department of military accounts.

In 1826, when Diwan Ganga Ram died, Dina Nath succeeded him as the head of military accounts department and keeper of the privy seal. In 1834, when Diwan Bhavani Das died, the Maharaja made him the head of the civil and finance office and conferred upon him, in 1838, the honorary title of Diwan.

By his ability and political acumen, Dina Nath rose to the highest position of power and influence in the affairs of the State. Lepel Griffin styles him the Talleyrand of the Punjab. After the Maharaja's death, Raja Dina Nath's influence increased. But Dina Nath knew how to keep his ambition in check and was one man in Lahore who made no enemies at the court. In the turbulent days following Ranjit Singh`s death, he refused to take sides with Rani Chand Kaur or Karivar Sher Singh. Sher Singh upon his succession to the throne, reposed his full trust in him. Dina Nath retained his position at the court during.

He was one of the signatories to the treaty which was concluded between the Sikhs and the British after the First Sikh War. Later, when a council was constituted in December 1846 for the governance of the Punjab, Raja Dina Nath was made its President, with the active support of the British.  He was the greatest man alive and most faithful to Maharaja Ranjit Singh.

Yet under the British rule he actively financed the independence efforts in secrecy.  The family of Raja Dina Nath came originally from Kashmir, where in the reign of the Mughal King Shah Jahan, some members of it held offices relating to court affairs.

Dina Nath, whose father had a subordinate appointment at Delhi, came to the Panjab in 1815 and obtained a berth in the Estate Office at Lahore. He first attracted Ranjit Singh's notice in 1818 by the great rapidity and clearness with which he did some important work entrusted to him.

Among the men who rose to power during the later days of the Maharaja's life, no one was more remarkable than Raja Dina Nath.
He was well and happily styled Talleyrand of the Panjab and his life and character bore a strong resemblance to those of the European statesmen.

Revolutions in which his friends and patrons perished passed him by: in the midst of bloodshed and assassination his life was never endangered. While confiscation and judicial robbery were the rule of the State, his wealth and power continually increased.
His sagacity and far-sightedness were such that when to other eyes the political sky was clear, he could perceive the signs of coming storm, which warned him to desert a losing party, or a falling friend.

Honest men do not survive many revolutions, and the Raja's falseness was the means to his success.
He was patriotic, but his love of country was subordinate to self.
He hated the English bitterly, for they were stronger than he or his country, but his interest compelled him to serve, like Samson, the Philistines he hated.

He was not without his notions of fidelity, and would stand by a friend, as long as he could do so with safety to himself. Even when he deserted him it was more from thoughts of danger to his wealth and influence than from personal fear, for, Raja Dina Nath was physically brave, and also possessed moral courage in an eminent degree, though it did not lead him to do right regardless of consequences. He possessed immense local knowledge and vast capacity for work; but his desire of keeping power in his own hands had an evil effect on the progress of (State) business.

He was an accomplished man of the world, courteous and considerate; well educated though nothing of a scholar; and in conversation with Europeans he would express himself with a boldness and apparent candour that were as pleasant, as they are unusual in Asiatics.
It was only in 1834 that Raja Dina Nath was made Finance Minister for which his qualifications were exceedingly high, but Maharaja (Ranjit Singh) had for many years reposed confidence in him, and he was on all occasions of importance, one of his most talented advisers.

After the death of Maharaja Ranjit Singh, he retained great influence with the chiefs and the army, and on British occupation of Lahore was appointed to the Council of Regency, of which he was the most able and useful member.
Although his position as the Head of Financial Department gave him many opportunities of enriching himself at the public expense, I of which there is every reason to believe he availed himself, he still worked more disinterestedly than others, and was of great service to the Resident of Lahore.

In November 1847, the title of the Raja of Kalanaur, with a jagir worth 20,000 rupees annually, was conferred upon him. With his clear head and business-like habits, it would have been almost impossible to disentangle the Darbar Accountancy, and after the annexation of the Panjab, Dina Nath's aid in Revenue and Jagir matters was almost as valuable as before.

At the time of revolt of Sikh army in 1848, it was asserted by some that Raja Dina Nath was a traitor at heart, that he himself had Encouraged the rising, and that had he not been a wealthy man with houses and gardens and many lakhs of rupees in Lahore, convenient for confiscation, he would have joined the rebels without hesitation, but these stories were perhaps invented by his enemies. Certain it is that on being recalled to Lahore, he zealously carried out the wishes of the British authorities in counteracting their (i.e. the rebels' anti-British) schemes.

After the annexation of the Panjab, Raja Dina Nath was confirmed in all of his jagirs, worth Rs. 46,460, which he held till his death in 1857. He died near Kot Khawaja Saeed, at Lahore, Pakistan. There he had developed a beautiful garden and it is still called as 'Rajay Wala Bagh'. The spot is a few meters away towards West from Samadh Maharajah Sher Singh at Kot Khawaja Saeed, Lahore. His descendants are:

1. Raja Amar Nath Madan

2. Raja Man Nath Madan

3. Raja Gyan Nath Madan

4. Kanwar Bharam Nath Madan

5. Raja Ravindera Madan

6. Raja Rajeev Madan 

7. Kanwar Ramchandra Madan

Raja Gyan Nath Madan was the Prime Minister of Jaipur.  He was a CIE, a ‘Companion of the British Empire’, an honorary title bestowed upon him by the British, in recognition of his numerous services to the Empire.  Raja Gyan Nath Madan was also conferred the hereditary title of ‘Raja’ by the British, which could be passed onto and used by the eldest son of each successive generation.

He purchased Khud Cottage in 1939, several years prior to Partition, when his family settled in Shimla.  His son, Kanwar Bharamnath Madan, was the first Deputy Commissioner of Shimla.  Successively, the title of ‘Raja’ has been passed on to Raja Gyan Nath Madan’s eldest grandson, Ravindera  Nath Madan and currently his great grandson, Rajeev Madan, whom still owns Khud Cottage.

Water well
Dina Nath commissioned the Well of Dina Nath in Lahore, Pakistan which, according to legend, has always been dry.

Sources
Suri, Sohan Lal, `Umdat-ut-Twarikh. Lahore, 1885–89
Griffin, Lepel, and C.F. Massy, Chiefs and Families of Note in the Punjab. Lahore, 1909
Hasrat, B.J., Life and Times of Ranjit Singh. Hoshiarpur, 1977

Kashmiri people
History of Sikhism
People of the Sikh Empire
1795 births
1857 deaths